The Coat of arms of Camagüey Province is the official heraldic symbol of Camagüey Province, Cuba.

History 
It was made on December 15, 1926, by Ángel Hernández Navarro, and approved by the Assembly of People's Power of the Camagüey Province on December 22, 1926. In 1976 after the provincial split of Cuban provinces and after Ciego de Ávila Province split from the province they removed the coat of arms. In 1995 they reput the coat of arms.

References

External links 
 Escudo de Camagüey - EcuRed

Coats of arms with the Phrygian cap
Coats of arms with sunrays
Coats of arms with suns
Coats of arms with trees